State Highway 25 (SH-25/OK-25) is a state highway in northeastern Oklahoma with two nonconnecting sections. The northern section runs between the communities of Pyramid Corners and Narcissa, and the southern section runs from east of Grove to the Missouri state line.

Route description

Western section
The route runs due east–west for its entire extent and is mostly level.

Highway 25 begins at the northern section of SH-2 at the unincorporated place of Pyramid Corners in Craig County. The road passes north of Timber Hill en route to Bluejacket. Four miles further east, SH-25 passes into Ottawa County. It then continues for exactly four miles further to its terminus at US-59/US-69 in Narcissa.

Eastern section
Like its western twin, the eastern SH-25 is arrow-straight, running due east–west, and experiences no gains or drops of elevation.

This Highway 25 begins three miles (5 km) east of Grove, where SH-10 makes a 90° turn from east–west to north–south; SH-25 continues its east-west path. The highway passes through rural northeastern Delaware County, running through the Cowskin Prairie. SH-25 terminates at the Missouri state line, where it becomes Route O. Route O continues through McDonald County, Missouri, eventually connecting Highway 25 to Route 43.

Junction lists

Western section

Eastern section

References

External links
 Northern SH-25 at OKHighways.com
 Southern SH-25 at OKHighways.com

025
Transportation in Craig County, Oklahoma
Transportation in Ottawa County, Oklahoma
Transportation in Delaware County, Oklahoma